Jorge Polar (1856–1932) was a Peruvian intellectual, poet, and politician born in Arequipa, Peru, on April 21 of 1856 . After leaving a trace in university teaching, cultural journalism, national politics and the administration of justice, died on June 6, 1932.

Education
He completed his secondary education at the National School of Independence, which was founded by Simon Bolivar . Then he entered the University of St. Augustine [1], and at age 18,  he earned his Juris Doctor in 1874.  Later he traveled to Lima and the Universidad Mayor de San Marcos [2] where he obtained his Ph.D. in History, Philosophy and Literature.

Works

A Biography of Juan Manuel Polar, 1886
Literary Studies, 1886
Something in Prose, 1887
Poems, 1887
Lucia and Julia Letter, 1887
White (novel), 1888
Arequipa, 1891, 1922
Light Philosophy, 1895
Stanzas of a poem, 1896
Aesthetics, 1903
At the University, 1904
Confession of a Professor, 1925
Our Melgar, 1928
Introduction to the Study of Modern Philosophy, 1928

References
Bermejo, Vladimir (July 8, 1954). Arequipa (1st edition). Arequipa: The Hive. pp. 478.

People from Arequipa
Peruvian politicians
19th-century Peruvian poets
1856 births
1932 deaths
Peruvian male poets
19th-century male writers